Tee-Hit-Ton Indians v. United States, 348 U.S. 272 (1955), is a United States Supreme Court case involving a suit by the Tee-Hit-Ton, a subgroup of the Tlingit people.  The Tee-Hit-Ton sought compensation from  Congress for lumber taken from lands they occupied. The court ruled against the Tee-Hit-Ton.

Background 
The Tee-Hit-Ton, a subgroup of the Tlingit people, brought an action in Court of Claims for compensation, under Fifth Amendment to the United States Constitution, for timber taken from tribal-occupied lands in Alaska authorized by the Secretary of Agriculture. The tribe contended it had "full proprietary ownership" or at least a recognized right to unrestricted possession; the federal government asserted the opposite, and argued that if the tribe had any rights, they were to use the land at the government’s will.

Procedural posture 
The tribe first filed a suit in the United States Court of Claims, which found that the tribe was an identifiable group residing in Alaska; its interest in the lands prior to the purchase of Alaska was an “original Indian title” but such a title was not enough to bring suit because the Congress did not recognize the tribe's legal rights of property ownership. The Court of Claims dismissed the tribe's suit.

Decision 
Justice Stanley Forman Reed, writing for the Court, stated that Congress did not intend to grant the Tee-Hit-Ton any permanent rights to the occupied lands but had given them permission to occupy it. Under the concept of conquest, any title to the land was extinguished when the "white man" came per Johnson v. M'Intosh. No case has held that taking of Indian title or use by Congress required compensation. Because there was no recognized title to the land, the court decided there was no right to compensation under the Fifth Amendment.

See also
List of United States Supreme Court cases, volume 348

External links
 
 

1955 in Alaska
1955 in United States case law
Aboriginal title case law in the United States
Alaska Natives and United States law
United States Native American case law
Takings Clause case law
Tlingit
United States Supreme Court cases
United States Supreme Court cases of the Warren Court